Yan Igorevich Kazayev (born 26 November 1991) is a Russian football midfielder. He plays as central midfielder or defensive midfielder for FC Baltika Kaliningrad.

Club career
He made his debut in the Russian Second Division for FC Karelia Petrozavodsk on 21 April 2011 in a game against FC Pskov-747 Pskov.

He made his Russian Premier League debut for FC Tosno on 30 July 2017 in a game against FC Zenit Saint Petersburg.

Honours

Club
Tosno
 Russian Cup: 2017–18

References

External links

1991 births
Footballers from Saint Petersburg
Living people
Russian footballers
Association football midfielders
FC Tosno players
FC Taganrog players
FC Dynamo Saint Petersburg players
FC Khimki players
FC Tom Tomsk players
PFC Sochi players
FC Baltika Kaliningrad players
Russian Premier League players
Russian First League players
Russian Second League players